My Heart Twinkle Twinkle is a 2015 South Korean television series starring Jang Shin-young, Bae Soo-bin, Lee Tae-im, and Nam Bo-ra. It aired on SBS from January 17 to April 12, 2015 on Saturdays and Sundays at 22:00 for 26 episodes.

Plot
Jinshim Original Fried Chicken restaurant is owned by Lee Jin-sam, who has three daughters Lee Soon-jin, Lee Soon-soo and Lee Soon-jung. Since their mother's death, eldest daughter Soon-jin has been running the restaurant and taking care of her father and younger sisters. She struggles to keep Jinshim afloat against its rival restaurant Woontak Chicken, which is managed by the ruthless Chun Woon-tak. Middle daughter Soon-soo is a pianist, but becomes heartbroken when her boyfriend breaks up with her because of her poor background. Youngest daughter Soon-jung finds herself caught in love triangle between two men, Jang Soon-chul and Cha Do-hoon.

Cast
Jang Shin-young as Lee Soon-jin
Lee Young-eun as young Soon-jin
Bae Soo-bin as Chun Woon-tak
Lee Tae-im as Lee Soon-soo
Heo Jung-eun as young Soon-soo
Lee Pil-mo as Jang Soon-chul
Nam Bo-ra as Lee Soon-jung
Shin Rin-ah as young Soon-jung
Oh Chang-seok as Cha Do-hoon
Lee Deok-hwa as Lee Jin-sam
Yoon Mi-ra as Lee Mal-sook
Son Eun-seo as Chun Geum-bi
Ha Jae-sook as Chun Eun-bi
Geum Bo-ra as Hwang Mi-ja
Do Ki-seok as Park Yong-sik
Jung Eun-woo as Gu Kwan-mo
Yoon Da-hoon as Pyo Sung-joo
Kim Dong-hyun as Cha Seok-nam
Jung Ae-ri as Kang Sung-sook
Jo Seung-hyun as Yang Min-ho
Cha Soo-yeon as Cha Ye-rin
Yang Hee-kyung as Restaurant owner Gong
Jung Gyu-soo as Han Young-pyo
Kim Hyung-kyu as Sun-ho
Seo Dong-won
 Kim Jin-yeop as Hyung-shik

References

International broadcast
 It aired in Vietnam on HTV2 from December 15, 2015 under the title Người chồng hai mặt.

External links
 

Seoul Broadcasting System television dramas
2015 South Korean television series debuts
2015 South Korean television series endings
Korean-language television shows
South Korean romance television series
Television series by Samhwa Networks